David Housewright is an Edgar Award-winning author of crime fiction and past President of the Private Eye Writers of America best known for his Holland Taylor and Rushmore McKenzie detective novels. Housewright won the Edgar from the Mystery Writers of America as well as a nomination from the PWA for his first novel "Penance." He has also earned three Minnesota Book Awards. Most of his novels take place in and around the greater St. Paul and Minneapolis area of Minnesota, USA and have been favorably compared to Raymond Chandler, Ross MacDonald and Robert B. Parker.

Biography 

Housewright was born and raised in St. Paul, Minnesota.  He is the son of Eugene Housewright, Sr., a businessman, and Patricia Langevin Housewright.  He attended Cretin High School where he was editor of the school newspaper until he was fired for printing an editorial opposing the Vietnam War.  “I attended an all-boys Catholic military school during the height of Vietnam war. Of course they fired me. You would have fired me, too,” Housewright told the Wild River Review.  He earned a degree in Journalism from the University of St. Thomas.  He now lives with his wife, writer and theater critic Renee Marie Valois, in Roseville, MN.

Career

Literary career 

Housewright’s first book, Penance (1995), which introduced detective Holland Taylor, won the 1996 Edgar Award for Best First Novel from the Mystery Writers of America and was short listed for a Shamus Award from the Private Eye Writers of America.  The second book in the series, Practice to Deceive (1997) won the 1998 Minnesota Book Award and was optioned for the movies.  In 2004, he introduced unlicensed P.I. Rushmore McKenzie with A Hard Ticket Home.  The sixth novel in the series, Jelly’s Gold (2009) also won the Minnesota Book Award, as did Curse of the Jade Lily (2013).  Tin City (2004), The Taking of Libbie, SD (2010) and Stealing the Countess (2017) were also nominated for the same prize.  In 2012, Housewright released two stand-alone novels – The Devil and the Diva (written with Renee Valois) – a 2013 Minnesota Book Award nominee – and a young adult crime novel entitled Finders Keepers.  He was elected President of the Private Eye Writers of America in June, 2014. That same year the Minnesota Historical Society and The Friends of the Saint Paul Public Library added Housewright's name and face to Minnesota Writers on the Map, joining accomplished writers Sinclair Lewis, F. Scott Fitzgerald, Maud Hart Lovelace, Laura Ingalls Wilder, August Wilson, Louise Erdrich, William Kent Krueger and Charles M. Schulz.

Advertising career 

Before starting a career as a novelist, Housewright worked as a copywriter and creative director for Twin Cities advertising agencies such as Kamstra Communications, DBK&O, Blaisdell & Westlie and his own shop Gerber-Housewright, as well as Andersen Windows.  His clients included Federal Express, 3M, Hormel Foods, Tony's Pizza, Jim Beam, the California Institute of Technology, Champion Batteries, and Partnership for a Drug-Free America.  His work has been cited for a number of industry awards including the CLIO, One Show, Communication Arts, The Show, Silver Microphone, Telly, Olivers, Pro-Comm, ACE, IABC, ARC, ECHO, and NAMA and has been featured in ADWEEK, Archive and ADS magazines.

Journalism career 

Housewright honed his research, interviewing, writing and editing skills while working as a news and sports reporter for the Owatonna People’s Press (summer internship), Minneapolis Tribune, Albert Lea (MN) Evening Tribune and the Grand Forks (ND) Herald.  His articles have also appeared in publications such as Format Magazine, ADWEEK, Crimespree Magazine and The History Channel Magazine..

Teaching career 
Housewright’s success as a novelist led to an invitation to teach a course on the Modern American Mystery Novel at the University of Minnesota. He frequently works as a writing instructor for the  Loft Literary Center in Minneapolis, Minnesota where he teaches a course on novel writing.

Works

Holland Taylor series 

 Penance (1995 Foul Play Press ) – Edgar Award Winner Best First Novel from Mystery Writers of America, Shamus nominee Private Eye Writers of America
 Practice to Deceive (1997 Foul Play Press ) – 1998 Minnesota Book Award winner
 Dearly Departed (1999 W. W. Norton )
 Darkness, Sing Me a Song (2018 Minotaur Books )
 First, Kill the Lawyers (2019 Minotaur Books )

Rushmore McKenzie series 
A Hard Ticket Home (2004 St. Martin's Press )
Tin City (2005 St. Martin's Press ) – 2006 Minnesota Book Award nominee
Pretty Girl Gone – (2006 Minotaur Books )
Dead Boyfriends (2007 Minotaur Books )
Madman On A Drum (2008 Minotaur Books )
Jelly's Gold (2009 Minotaur Books ) – 2010 Minnesota Book Award winner
The Taking of Libbie, SD (2010 Minotaur Books ) – 2011 Minnesota Book Award nominee
Highway 61 (2011 Minotaur Books )
Curse of the Jade Lily (2012 Minotaur Books ) – 2013 Minnesota Book Award winner
The Last Kind Word (2013 Minotaur Books )
The Devil May Care (2014 Minotaur Books )
Unidentified Woman #15 (2015 Minotaur Books )
Stealing the Countess (2016 Minotaur Books ) - 2017 Minnesota Book Award nominee
What the Dead Leave Behind (2017 Minotaur Books )
Like To Die (2018 Minotaur Books )
Dead Man's Mistress (2019 Minotaur Books )
From the Grave (2020 Minotaur Books )
What Doesn't Kill Us (2021 Minotaur Books ISBN 9781250756992)
Something Wicked (2022 Minotaur Books ISBN 9781250757012)

Stand-alone novels 

 The Devil and the Diva (2012 Down & Out Books ) – written with Renee Valois – 2013 Minnesota Book Award nominee
 Finders Keepers (2012 Down & Out Books )

Short stories 

 "Kids Today" (Ellery Queen Mystery Magazine, July 1999)
 "How To Trick Any Woman Into Having Sex (aka The Sultan of Seduction)," True Romance Magazine, April 1999)
 "A Domestic Matter" (The Silence of the Loons, 2005 Nodin Press )
 "Mai-Nu’s Window" (Twin Cities Noir, 2006 Akashic Books )
 "Miss Behavin’" (Resort to Murder, 2007 Nodin Press )
 "Last Laugh" (Once Upon A Crime, 2009 Nodin Press )
 "Time of Death" (Deadly Treats, 2011 Nodin Press )
 "Obsessive Behavior" (Writes of Spring, 2012 Nodin Press )
 "A Turn of the Card" (Fifteen Tales of Murder, Mayhem and Malice From the Land of Minnesota Nice, 2012 Nodin Press

References 

1955 births
Living people
American crime fiction writers
Writers from Saint Paul, Minnesota
American male novelists
University of St. Thomas (Minnesota) alumni
20th-century American novelists
21st-century American novelists
20th-century American male writers
21st-century American male writers
Novelists from Minnesota